Code Ninjas is a for-profit educational organization specializing in teaching coding to kids (specifically JavaScript, Lua and C#) and is the largest kids coding franchise in the world with over 400 locations open and operating in three countries. It is headquartered in Pearland, Texas.  It was founded by David Graham in 2016, inspired by watching his son learn Tae Kwon Do. It has locations in the United States, Canada, and United Kingdom.

Structure
Code Ninjas buildings are separated into classrooms and lobbies. The lobbies are for parents to pick up and drop off their kids and have free Wi-Fi, refreshments, and games or toys for the kids to play with while on break or waiting for their parents. Meanwhile, the classrooms (referred to as dojos) have small desks and are restricted for only Code Senseis (the educators, usually in their teens), and the students, aged 7–14, who are given laptops to do programming. Each of the kids start out at white belt, and work their way up the "Path of Enlightenment" to Black Belt. Different belts have different coding languages. For example, white, yellow, orange, and green belts learn JavaScript using a Konva based game engine, blue belts learn LuaU, Roblox's own version of Lua, and purple, brown, red, and black belts learn C# with Unity.

Summer Camps
During the summer, Code Ninjas offers camps alongside normal classes, where the parents drop their children off for a half-day summer class during the weekdays, either in the morning or in the afternoon. The content of these camps usually revolves around coding or other game development aspects in either Minecraft or Roblox; however, some camps also focus on non-coding topics such as becoming a YouTuber.

References

Coding schools